Francis Morton (born 5 November 1992) is a Ghanaian professional footballer who currently plays as a left-back for Ebusua Dwarfs in the Ghana Football Leagues.

Club career
Francis Morton began his youth career with Ghana Premier League club Liberty Professionals, prior to joining Ebusua Dwarfs on 1 July 2012 for the beginning of the 2012–2013 Ghanaian Premier League season and Morton debuted in the Ebusua Dwarfs for the 2012–2013 Ghanaian Premier League season on 7 October 2012 in a 1–1 draw against Berekum Arsenal for the Robert Mensah Sports Stadium.

International career
In November 2013, coach Maxwell Konadu invited Morton to be included in the Ghana 30-man team for the 2013 WAFU Nations Cup. Morton helped Ghana defeat Senegal, 3-1. Morton was included in the Ghana national football team for the 2014 African Nations Championship that finished runner-up.

Honours

National Team 

 WAFU Nations Cup Winner: 2013
 African Nations Championship Runner-up: 2014

References

1992 births
Living people
Association football fullbacks
Ghanaian footballers
Liberty Professionals F.C. players
Ebusua Dwarfs players
Ghana Premier League players
WAFU Nations Cup players
Ghana A' international footballers
2014 African Nations Championship players
African Games gold medalists for Ghana
African Games medalists in football
Competitors at the 2011 All-Africa Games
Ghana international footballers